Albert Boyd Sojourner (February 4, 1872 - November 17, 1951) was a Democratic member of the Mississippi House of Representatives, representing Adams County from 1916 to 1924.

Biography 
Albert Boyd Sojourner was born on February 4, 1872, in Kingston, Adams County, Mississippi. His father, Absolom Hardy Sojourner, was a Confederate Civil War veteran and member of the Jeff Davis Cavalry Legion. Albert was the Justice of the Peace in Adams County, District No. 2, from 1909 to 1915, and was elected to the Mississippi House of Representatives, representing his native Adams County, in 1915. He was then re-elected in 1919. He died on November 17, 1951.

Personal life 
He married Kate Aubrey Bailey in 1907, and she died in 1915. They had five children, Absolom Hardy, Carol Picket, Alexander Boyd, William Aubrey, and Laurence Jackson Sojourner. Albert's great-granddaughter via his son Boyd is Mississippi state senator Melanie Sojourner.

References 

1872 births
1951 deaths
Democratic Party members of the Mississippi House of Representatives
People from Adams County, Mississippi